Gilgamesh Brewing is a brewery in Salem, Oregon. It was established in 2009 and is family owned. Gilgamesh beers are distributed primarily in and around Salem.

History
Gilgamesh Brewing was founded by Lee Radtke and his three sons Mike, Nick, and Matt.  The family has lived in the area since the 1970s and were home brewing enthusiasts before establishing Gilgamesh Brewing.  The business started in Turner, Oregon before expanding into downtown Salem. 

Gilgamesh beers were available at the Winter Ale House at the Reed Opera House and the initial brewery location was at 210 Liberty Street SE, Suite 150, Salem, Oregon. In late 2012 the brewery relocated to a new 18,000 sq. ft. location on Madrona Avenue with a restaurant and pub. 

The name of the company comes from the Epic of Gilgamesh, often cited as an early source for beer brewing and use.

List beers/styles

Standard offerings include:

References

External links
Gilgamesh Brewing

Companies based in Salem, Oregon
2009 establishments in Oregon
Beer brewing companies based in Oregon
American companies established in 2009 
Food and drink companies established in 2009